Bruce Bentley (born 9 September 1944) is a former Australian rules footballer who played with Carlton in the Victorian Football League (VFL). His father, Perce Bentley, also played in the VFL.

Notes

External links 

Bruce Bentley's profile at Blueseum

1944 births
Carlton Football Club players
Australian rules footballers from Victoria (Australia)
Living people